Monica Margaret Dolan (born 15 March 1969) is an English actress. She won the BAFTA TV Award for Best Supporting Actress for playing Rosemary West in Appropriate Adult (2011).

Career
Dolan was born in Middlesbrough and trained at the Guildhall School of Music and Drama. Her credits include Agatha Christie's Poirot, Dalziel and Pascoe, Tipping the Velvet (with Rachael Stirling) and Judge John Deed. She also starred in ITV drama U Be Dead.

Her stage appearances include She Stoops to Conquer,  King Lear and The Seagull, the latter two with Ian McKellen.

Dolan played British serial killer Rosemary West in the controversial ITV drama Appropriate Adult in 2011, receiving critical acclaim and a BAFTA TV Award for Best Supporting Actress.

On stage, she starred as Loretta in Chalet Lines, written by Lee Mattinson, at the Bush Theatre. In 2013, she portrayed twin sisters Meg and Maeve Carter in the BBC TV series Call the Midwife. She appeared in W1A (a three-series follow-up to BBC2's BAFTA-winning comedy series Twenty Twelve), as Senior Communications Officer Tracey Pritchard.

In 2016, Dolan appeared as Janet McIntyre in the BBC two-part drama The Witness for the Prosecution, an Agatha Christie play adapted for television by Sarah Phelps.

In 2017, she made guest appearances in Catastrophe, Death in Paradise and Strike, whilst also writing and starring in her debut one-woman play, The B*easts at the Edinburgh Festival Fringe. The play run went on to win an Edinburgh Stage Award.

In 2018, Dolan made a guest appearance in an episode of the fourth series of Inside No 9, followed by playing Marion Thorpe in the critically acclaimed miniseries A Very English Scandal. The B*easts also transferred for a limited London run at the Bush Theatre.

In 2019, she portrayed Karen Richards in the stage production of All About Eve for which she received a Laurence Olivier Award for Best Supporting Actress.

June 2020 saw her appearing in the remade television series of Alan Bennett's Talking Heads on BBC One. In one of two newly-written episodes, Dolan performed a monologue in "The Shrine". This was one of the episodes staged at London's Bridge Theatre in September 2020, with Dolan reprising her role.

In 2021 Dolan was acclaimed for her Suffolk accent playing May the wife of Mr Basil Brown in The Dig who discovered the Anglo-Saxon treasure at Sutton Hoo near Woodbridge, Suffolk.

In 2022 she appeared alongside Eddie Marsan in the ITV drama The Thief, His Wife and the Canoe as Anne Darwin.

Filmography

References

External links
 Monica Dolan at the British Film Institute
 

1969 births
20th-century English actresses
21st-century English actresses
Living people
English film actresses
English stage actresses
English television actresses
Actresses from Yorkshire
Actors from Middlesbrough
Best Supporting Actress BAFTA Award (television) winners